Hayley Nolan (born 7 March 1997) is an Irish professional footballer who plays as a midfielder for London City Lionesses in the FA Women's Championship and the Republic of Ireland national team.

Club career

Early years
Nolan was raised in County Kildare, Ireland, and is the daughter of Caroline Kelly and John Nolan. Her father was the coach of Johnstown United and, after Nolan began to show potential, he encouraged her to sign for local boys club Kill Celtic at the age of six. She played with the boys' teams until under-12 level before signing for her first women's team, Peamount United. Nolan also grew up playing gaelic football, representing Kill GAA at U12, U14, U16 and minor.

Playing football as a schoolgirl, Nolan won honours at provincial and national level representing both Peamount United and her high school, St. Marys College Naas. In September 2013, she was named player of the match as Peamount beat Salthill Devon in the 2013 FAI Umbro Women’s U16 Cup final.

Peamount United
In 2013, Nolan was promoted to Peamount United senior women's side in Women's National League. In 2015 she played all 120 minutes in a 3–2 WNL Cup final defeat to Raheny United after extra-time.

Hartford Hawks

Having originally planned at attend University College Dublin, Nolan was recruited by the University of Hartford and accepted a four-year scholarship to play college soccer and study economics and finance. She played four seasons for Hartford Hawks including two as team captain in 2017 and 2018. As a freshman Nolan was named to the America East All-Rookie Team and also received America East All-Championship Team honors, something she went on to replicate in all four seasons. Her first career goal was a game-winner against conference opponents Stony Brook on 1 October 2015.

Nolan was named captain at the start of her junior year in 2017. She also changed position, moving from midfield to defense. She was named to the America East All-Conference First Team for the first time and, alongside teammate Sierra Stone, was also named to the Second Team All-East Region.

As a senior, Nolan scored a career-high three goals and helped the defense post a conference-best 0.92 goals-against average. She was named an America East All-Conference First Team selection for the second consecutive year, was an NEILA All-New England First Team selection and United Soccer Coaches All-East Region Second Team pick.

In total, Nolan finished her collegiate career with six goals and three assists, helping contribute to 24 shutouts in 70 appearances and 68 starts.

Connecticut Fusion
On 18 March 2018, Nolan was one of the first six players signed to Connecticut Fusion ahead of their inaugural season in the second-tier UWS. She made six appearances, scoring three goals.

London City Lionesses
On 28 August 2020, Nolan signed for London City Lionesses of the English Championship. While with the club, Nolan was one of 31 footballers selected to take part in BT Sport series Ultimate Goal and compete for a chance to play in front of scouts in autumn 2020.

International career

Youth
Nolan has represented the Republic of Ireland at under-15, under-16, under-17, and under-19 level.

She was part of the Ireland team that reached the semi-finals at the 2014 UEFA Women's Under-19 Championship before eventually losing to Netherlands 4–0. Later that year she was nominated for the Under-19 Women's International Player of the Year at the FAI International Football Awards. In April 2016, Nolan scored in victories over Azerbaijan and Poland during the Elite Round of 2016 UEFA Women's Under-19 Championship qualification.

Senior
In October 2019, Nolan received her first call up to the senior team by newly-appointed manager Vera Pauw for a UEFA Women's Euro 2021 qualifier against Ukraine. Nolan was involved as an unused substitute in six matchday squads throughout qualification. She made her debut on 11 April 2021 as a 74th minute substitute for Megan Connolly in a 1–0 friendly defeat to Belgium.

Career statistics

Club
.

References

External links

 Hayley Nolan at Hartford Hawks
 Hayley Nolan at the Football Association of Ireland
 
 

1997 births
Living people
Hartford Hawks women's soccer players
Republic of Ireland women's association footballers
Republic of Ireland women's international footballers
Women's association football midfielders
Peamount United F.C. players
Women's National League (Ireland) players
Association footballers from County Kildare
Ladies' Gaelic footballers who switched code
Women's association football defenders
Expatriate women's soccer players in the United States
Irish expatriate sportspeople in the United States
Republic of Ireland expatriate association footballers
Gaelic games players from County Kildare
Women's Championship (England) players
London City Lionesses players
Republic of Ireland women's youth international footballers